Loves Corner is an unincorporated community in Hardin County, Illinois, United States. Loves Corner is located at the intersection of Illinois Route 1 and Illinois Route 146, north of Cave-In-Rock.

References

Unincorporated communities in Hardin County, Illinois
Unincorporated communities in Illinois